William Edward is a cricketer.

William Edward may also refer to:

William Edward, List of Lord Mayors of London

See also

William Edwards (disambiguation)